The 2014 ACC Championship Game is the tenth football championship game for the Atlantic Coast Conference.  It featured the Florida State Seminoles, winners of the ACC's Atlantic Division, and the Georgia Tech Yellow Jackets, winners of the ACC's Coastal Division.  This was the game's fifth consecutive year at Bank of America Stadium in Charlotte, North Carolina.

Teams

Atlantic Division champions

Coastal Division champions

Scoring summary

1st quarter scoring:
 GT - TD	09:50	Synjyn Days 1 Yd Run (Harrison Butker Kick) FSU 0 GT 7
 FSU - TD	07:42	Nick O'Leary 46 Yd Pass from Jameis Winston (Roberto Aguayo Kick) FSU 7 GT 7
 GT - TD	01:45	Synjyn Days 1 Yd Run (Harrison Butker Kick) FSU 7 GT 14

2nd quarter scoring:
 FSU - TD	14:10	Dalvin Cook 1 Yd Run (Roberto Aguayo Kick) FSU 14 GT 14
 GT - TD	08:02	Zach Laskey 4 Yd Run (Harrison Butker Kick) FSU 14 GT 21
 FSU - TD	05:40	Rashad Greene 44 Yd pass from Jameis Winston (Roberto Aguayo Kick) FSU 21 GT 21
 FSU - TD	00:30	Rashad Greene 9 Yd pass from Jameis Winston (Roberto Aguayo Kick) FSU 28 GT 21

3rd quarter scoring:
 GT - TD	08:01	Synjyn Days 1 Yd Run (Harrison Butker Kick) FSU 28 GT 28
 FSU - FG	03:13	Roberto Aguayo 33 Yd Field Goal FSU 31 GT 28

4th quarter scoring:
 FSU - FG	10:25	Roberto Aguayo 32 Yd Field Goal FSU 34 GT 28
 FSU - FG	04:28	Roberto Aguayo 28 Yd Field Goal FSU 37 GT 28
 GT - TD	01:47	Darren Waller 25 Yd pass from Justin Thomas (Harrison Butker Kick) FSU 37 GT 35

Statistics

References

Championship
ACC Championship Game
Florida State Seminoles football games
Georgia Tech Yellow Jackets football games
December 2014 sports events in the United States
ACC